Haft Ashiyan or Haft Ashian may refer to:
 Haft Ashiyan, Kermanshah
 Haft Ashian, Sonqor, Kermanshah Province
 Haft Ashiyan Rural District, in Kermanshah Province